Visaltia is a municipality in the Serres regional unit, Greece. The seat of the municipality is in Nigrita. It was named after the ancient region Bisaltia. The ancient city of Berge is located here.

Municipality
The municipality Visaltia was formed at the 2011 local government reform by the merger of the following 4 former municipalities, that became municipal units:
Achinos
Nigrita
Tragilos
Visaltia

The municipality has an area of 658.333 km2, the municipal unit 144.255 km2.

Province
The province of Visaltia was one of the provinces of the Serres Prefecture. Its territory corresponded with that of the current municipality Visaltia, and part of the municipal unit Strymoniko. It was abolished in 2006.

References

Municipalities of Central Macedonia
Populated places in Serres (regional unit)
Provinces of Greece